KBNS-CD, virtual and UHF digital channel 36, is a low-powered, Class A independent television station licensed to Branson, Missouri, United States. Founded November 30, 1989, the station is owned by The Vacation Channel, LLC.

The Vacation Channel's coverage area includes all the cable systems and is broadcast over the air within an approximate 20-30 mile circle of Branson. This coverage reaches approximately 4.5 million viewers each year.

Digital channels
KBNS is multiplexed with two digital subchannels.

36.1 The Vacation Channel
The station's primary feed airs local information primarily aimed at visitors to the Branson area under the brand The Vacation Channel. The channel also broadcasts local news, weather 4 times per hour, children's programming, public affairs and local sports programming as well as special events coverage. KBNS streams the main 36.1 channel over the Internet.

36.2
The 36.2 channel runs an all-infomercial format from Lifehacks, a direct response television firm.

Until 2019, 36.2 was billed as the Branson Weather Channel and was affiliated with The Local AccuWeather Channel until that network began phaseout.

External links 
The Vacation Channel official site
The Vacation Channel's official Branson information site

BNS-CD
Television channels and stations established in 1989
Low-power television stations in the United States